Gregg Barton (Born Harold Wilson Barker, June 5, 1912 – November 28, 2000) was an American actor, who played various roles in feature films and television series.

Career
Born in Oswego, New York, Barton is possibly best remembered for having played the role of Stan Richter in the syndicated television series The Gene Autry Show. He appeared sixteen times on another syndicated series, The Range Rider, eleven times on Annie Oakley, seven times each on The Adventures of Wild Bill Hickok and The Lone Ranger, six times on 26 Men,  five times on ABC's The Life and Legend of Wyatt Earp, four times on NBC's Laramie, and three times each on The Texan and Tales of the Texas Rangers.

Barton played guest roles in other series too, such as Sky King (1952 and 1956), Adventures of Superman (1953), The Cisco Kid (1954), Steve Donovan, Western Marshal (1956), Fury (1958), Jefferson Drum (1958), The Deputy (1959), Bonanza (1960), Wagon Train (1962), and Death Valley Days (1969).

He appeared in such films as Flying Tigers (1942) with John Wayne, The Three Musketeers (1948), The Man from Laramie (1955), China Doll (1958) with Victor Mature and Morituri (1965) with Marlon Brando.

Selected filmography 

1942: A Yank at Eton - Coach (uncredited)
1942: Flying Tigers - Tex Norton
1947: The Beginning or the End – Enola Gay Navigator (uncredited)
1947: West to Glory – Jim Barrett
1947: Kilroy Was Here – Guard
1947: Song of the Thin Man – Male Nurse (uncredited)
1947: Big Town After Dark – Detective (uncredited)
1948: Albuquerque – Murkill's Henchman in Buckboard / Ted's Assailant (uncredited)
1948: Homecoming – Captain (uncredited)
1948: Raw Deal – Car Owner (uncredited)
1948: Tap Roots – Captain (uncredited)
1948: Michael O'Halloran – Officer Barker
1948: The Three Musketeers – Musketeer (uncredited)
1948: Joan of Arc – Capt. Louis de Culan
1948: Command Decision – Sergeant (uncredited)
1949: Johnny Stool Pigeon – Treasury Man (uncredited)
1949: Not Wanted – Patrolman
1949: Massacre River – Frank
1949: Scene of the Crime – Detective (uncredited)
1949: Task Force – Pilot (uncredited)
1949: That Midnight Kiss – Stagehand (uncredited)
1949: Fighting Man of the Plains – Rowdy Cowboy at Dance (uncredited)
1949: The Threat – Reporter (uncredited)
1950: When Willie Comes Marching Home – Colonel (uncredited)
1950: Mule Train – Rollins (uncredited)
1950: The Outriders – Outrider (uncredited)
1950: The Gunfighter – Pete's Pal (uncredited)
1950: Texas Dynamo – Luke
1950: Beyond the Purple Hills – Ross Pardee – Henchman (uncredited)
1950: Tripoli – Huggins
1950: The Blazing Sun – Trot Lucas
1950: Gambling House – First Police Officer (uncredited)
1951: Gene Autry and the Mounties – Sergeant Stuart (uncredited)
1951: Silver City Bonanza – Henchman Hank
1951: Whirlwind – Bill Trask
1951: Fort Worth – Clevenger's Man (uncredited)
1951: The Red Badge of Courage – Soldier (uncredited)
1951: The Racket – Rookie Cop (uncredited)
1951: The Golden Horde – Kalmuk Officer (uncredited)
1951: Valley of Fire – Henchman Blackie (uncredited)
1951: Distant Drums – Pvt. James W. Tasher (uncredited)
1952: Bend of the River – Miner (uncredited)
1952: At Sword's Point – Regent's Guardman at Fallen Tree (uncredited)
1952: The Gunman – Bill Longley – Henchman
1952: Apache Country – Luke Thorn (uncredited)
1952: The World in His Arms – Seaman (uncredited)
1952: Dead Man's Trail – Henchman Yeager
1952: Wagon Team – Henchman (uncredited)
1952: Operation Secret (1952) – Sentry (uncredited)
1952: Montana Belle – Deputy Stewart (uncredited)
1952: The Maverick – George Fane
1953: Winning of the West – Clint Raybold
1953: The Man Behind the Gun – Henchman Luke (uncredited)
1953: Gunsmoke – Bratton (uncredited)
1953: Rebel City – Man dressed like Greeley (uncredited)
1953: Law and Order – Wingett (uncredited)
1953: The Moonlighter – Bar X Man in Lynch Mob (uncredited)
1953: Saginaw Trail – Trapper (uncredited)
1953: Captain Scarface – Captain of Rescue Boat (uncredited)
1953: Last of the Pony Riders – Dutch Murdoch
1953: Tumbleweed – Miner (uncredited)
1954: The Command – Capt. Forsythe (uncredited)
1954: Jivaro – Edwards
1954: Gunfighters of the Northwest (Serial) – Hank Bridger
1954: The Forty-Niners – Card Player (uncredited)
1954: Drums Across the River – Fallon
1954: Man with the Steel Whip – Stanton (uncredited)
1954: The Far Country – Rounds (uncredited)
1954: The Law vs. Billy the Kid – Parson Ranch Hand (uncredited)
1954: Two Guns and a Badge – Outlaw
1954: Riding with Buffalo Bill (Serial) – Henchman Bart
1954: Masterson of Kansas – Sutton – Henchman
1955: Dial Red O – Attendant (uncredited)
1955: The Man from Laramie – Fritz
1955: Seven Angry Men – O'Neil (uncredited)
1955: Bobby Ware Is Missing – Man in Search Party (uncredited)
1955: The Second Greatest Sex – Simon's Henchman (uncredited)
1956: The Conqueror – Jalair (uncredited)
1956: Backlash – Sleepy
1956: Uranium Boom – Phil McGinnus
1956: Raw Edge – McKay
1956: Blazing the Overland Trail – Captain Carter
1956: Tension at Table Rock – Striker (uncredited)
1957: Last of the Badmen – John Spencer / John Dozer (uncredited)
1957: Jet Pilot – Military Policeman (uncredited)
1957: Joe Dakota – Tom Jensen
1958: Man from God's Country – Col. Miller
1958: The Toughest Gun in Tombstone – Henchman Leslie (uncredited)
1958: China Doll – Airman
1958: The Badlanders – Mine Foreman (uncredited)
1959: Good Day for a Hanging – Frank (uncredited)
1959: Never Steal Anything Small – Deputy Warden
1959: Lone Texan – Ben Hollis
1959: The Gunfight at Dodge City – Townsman (uncredited)
1963: The Gun Hawk – Henchman
1965: Morituri – Merchant Marine (uncredited)

References

External links
 
 
 The American Film Institute Catalog of Motion Pictures, volume 1, part 1, by American Film Institute.

1912 births
2000 deaths
20th-century American male actors
American male film actors
American male television actors
Male Western (genre) film actors
Male actors from Los Angeles
Male actors from New York City
Male actors from San Diego
People from Long Island City, Queens
Western (genre) television actors